Mario Antonio Rodríguez Cortez (born 18 March 1972) is a Peruvian former footballer who played as a midfielder. He made eleven appearances for the Peru national team from 1993 to 1996. He was also part of Peru's squad for the 1993 Copa América tournament.

References

External links
 

1972 births
Living people
Footballers from Lima
Peruvian footballers
Association football midfielders
Peru international footballers
Club Alianza Lima footballers
Sporting Cristal footballers